USS Nyanza was a large steamer purchased by the Union Navy during the American Civil War.  She was assigned by the Union Navy to gunboat duty in the waterways of the rebellious Confederate States of America.

Construction 

Nyanza, a wooden side wheel steamer built at Belle Vernon, Pennsylvania, in 1863, was purchased by the Navy at Cincinnati, Ohio, 4 November 1863; and commissioned at Mound City, Illinois, Acting Lt. Samuel B. Washburn in command 21 December 1863.

Mississippi river 
 
During the Civil War, Nyanza patrolled the Mississippi River and its tributaries protecting Union lines of communication and supply on the great inland waterway and preventing Confederate activity.

She captured schooner J. W. Wilder in the Atchafalaya River, Louisiana, 15 March 1864; and took schooner Mandoline, in Atchafalaya Bay, Louisiana, 13 April.

Post-war 
 
After hostilities ceased, Nyanza decommissioned at New Orleans, Louisiana on 21 July 1865 and was sold at public auction to Owen Finnegan 12 August 1865.
 
Redocumented 26 August 1865, the side wheeler remained in merchant service until 1873.

See also

Anaconda Plan
Mississippi Squadron

References 

Ships of the Union Navy
Ships built in Belle Vernon, Pennsylvania
Steamships of the United States Navy
Gunboats of the United States Navy
American Civil War patrol vessels of the United States
1863 ships